The Bad Reputation Tour is a ongoing concert tour by American rapper and singer Kid Rock in support of his twelfth studio album Bad Reputation (2022). It began on April 6, 2022, in Evansville, Indiana and is concluding on July 15, 2023 in Detroit.

Summary
On January 15, 2021, Kid Rock announced his "possible retirement". He noted that he had been performing on stages since the late 1980s, and that he doesn't think his health will allow him to be "on stage at age 70 like Mick Jagger".  On January 24, 2022, Kid Rock announced a tour with Grand Funk Railroad, Jason Bonham's Led Zeppelin Evening, Foreigner, and an appearance by Trey Lewis at every show.

Kid Rock also threatened to cancel shows with any kind of restrictions related to the COVID-19 pandemic and reportedly cancelled a few shows including in Buffalo, New York and Toronto due to COVID-19 protocols.

Typical setlist
 "Devil Without a Cause"
 "You Never Met a Motherfucker Quite Like Me"
 "American Bad Ass"
 "Cocky"
 "All Summer Long"
 "First Kiss"
 "Don't Tell Me How to Live"
 "Cowboy"
 "My Kind Of Country"
 "Wasting Time"
 "Bad Reputation"
 "Picture"
 Dicked Down in Dallas (with Trey Lewis)
 "3 Sheets to the Wind (What's My Name)"/La Grange/"Cat Scratch Fever"/"Superstition"
 "Rock n Roll Jesus"
 "Only God Knows Why"
 "Born Free"
 Donald Trump Message/"We the People"
 "Rockin'"
 "Bawitdaba"

Tour dates

Cancelled shows

Notes

Personnel
 Kid Rock – lead vocals, guitar, turntables, drums, saxophone (gives it to a random female fan)
 Jason Krause – rhythm guitar, acoustic guitar 
 Marlon Young – lead guitar
 Paradime – turntables, background vocals
 Jimmie Bones – keyboard, organ, piano, harmonica
 Aaron Julison – bass
 Stefanie Eulinberg – drums
 Larry Fratangelo – percussion
 Shannon Curfman – guitar, background vocals
 Herschel Boone – background vocals and lead vocals on "Superstitious"

References

2022 concert tours
Concert tours
Concert tours of North America